The 1995–96 season was Heart of Midlothian F.C.s 13th consecutive season of play in the Scottish Premier Division. Hearts also competed in the Scottish Cup and the Scottish League Cup.

Fixtures

Friendlies

League Cup

Scottish Cup

Scottish Premier Division

League table

Stats

Scorers

See also
List of Heart of Midlothian F.C. seasons

References 

Source London Hearts season 1995-96

External links 
 Official Club website

Heart of Midlothian F.C. seasons
Heart of Midlothian